The White Company was a 14th-century English mercenary Company of Adventure, led from its arrival in Italy in 1361 to 1363 by the German Albert Sterz and later by the Englishman John Hawkwood. Although the White Company is the name by which it is popularly known, it was initially called the Great Company of English and Germans and would later often be referred to as the English Company (Italian: , Latin: Societas Angliciis).

Origins of the name 
No medieval source explains the company's name. The traditional view is that it is a reference to the brightly polished armour of the men-at-arms. However, William Caferro has suggested that it was because the company originally wore white surcoats. This view might be supported by the fact that mercenaries led by Arnaud de Cervole in France at this time were known as bandes blanches.

Makeup of the company 
Despite it being commonly referred to as the English Company, personnel were drawn from a wide range of nationalities, reflecting the international nature of Italian mercenary warfare in the 14th century, including at various times Germans, Italians and Hungarians but mostly English and French veterans of the Hundred Years' War. The numbers of men in the company varied over the years. In 1361, it is recorded as having 3,500 cavalry and 2,000 infantry. At its lowest ebb in 1388, it had a mere 250 men.
The company was organised in lances of three men; a man-at-arms, a squire and a page. Of these, only the man-at-arms and squire were armed. These lances were organised into contingents, each under a corporal, who was often an independent sub-contractor. This structure gave the company a certain democratic element and it is thought that John Hawkwood first gained command of the company in 1365 by election.
The company contained numbers of infantry, particularly English longbowmen. These could be mounted on horses as were the 600 involved in the Battle of Castagnaro in 1387.
In addition to its military structure, the company had an administrative staff, usually Italian, of chancellors and notaries who managed the legal and contractual aspects of the company's relationship with its employers, and a treasurer to handle its financial affairs. The White Company's treasurer was an Englishman, William Thornton.

Tactics 
The White Company is credited with introducing to Italy the practice of dismounting men-at-arms in battle, a practice already commonplace in the battles of the Hundred Years' War in France. Contemporary witnesses record that the company fought dismounted and in close order, advancing with two men-at-arms holding the same lance at a slow pace while shouting loud battle cries. The longbowmen apparently drew up behind. This is not to suggest that they abandoned mounted combat altogether. The Battle of Castagnaro was won by a cavalry charge.

Battles 
The White Company was involved in the following battles:
Battle of Canturino 1363
First Battle of Cascina 1364
Battle of San Mariano 1365
Second Battle of Cascina 1369
Battle of Montichiari 1373
Battle of Castagnaro 1387
Battle of Tizzana 1391

The company was also involved in a large number of skirmishes, sieges and attacks on towns. Less honourable was their participation in the Massacre at Cesena in 1377, when several thousand civilians were killed.

Popular culture 
The White Company is the title of a novel by Sir Arthur Conan Doyle which is very loosely based on the historical company. Unlike the historical company, the main focus of the action is in Spain and the White Company led by Bertrand de Guesclin to Spain in 1366 was also an inspiration. The book was popular as an adventure novel, its well-chosen title raising the profile of the historical company among a lay readership.

The Band of the Hawk, the mercenary company led by Griffith in the Japanese manga Berserk by Kentaro Miura, is based on John Hawkwood and the White Company.

The White Company is the title of a novel in Griff Hosker's Sir John Hawkwood series, which romances the life of Sir John.

See also 
Condottiero

External links 
Condottieri di Ventura database

References 

1361 establishments in Europe
14th-century condottieri
14th-century establishments in Italy
Mercenary units and formations of the Middle Ages